Kate Holmes or Katie Holmes may refer to:
Katie Holmes, American actress
Katie Holmes (historian)
Kate Holmes, British keyboarder and head of the band Client known as Client A
Kate Holmes, one of pen names of the American writer Anne Holmberg